George Jackson (1761–1805) was an Irish politician.

His was the eldest son of George Jackson and his wife Jane Cuffe, daughter of James Cuffe and Elizabeth Gore, and sister of James Cuffe, 1st Baron Tyrawley and entered Trinity College, Dublin in 1777.

He succeeded his uncle Lord Tyrawley in representing Mayo in the Irish House of Commons from 1798 to the Act of Union in 1801. He supported the Union, but received relatively little by way of reward. He was subsequently a Member of Parliament for Mayo in the first Parliament of the United Kingdom until 1802. His application to be made a baronet was unsuccessful., but despite this disappointment, he was generally seen as a reliable supporter of the Government in the Commons.

He married Maria, the daughter and heiress of William Rutledge of Foxford, County Mayo, and had 6 sons and 7 daughters. His son James, born in 1790, became a Lieutenant-General in the British Army. His daughter Jane married  Major Christopher L'Estrange Carleton of Market Hill, County Fermanagh. His son William (1787-1822) married Louise Jean Blair, daughter of William Blair of Blair.

References

    
    
    

1761 births
1805 deaths
Alumni of Trinity College Dublin
Politicians from County Mayo
Members of the Parliament of Ireland (pre-1801) for County Mayo constituencies
Irish MPs 1798–1800
Members of the Parliament of the United Kingdom for County Mayo constituencies (1801–1922)
UK MPs 1801–1802